Tinajas may refer to:
Tinajas, Chiriquí, Panama
Tinajas, Spain